Hits+ is a compilation album by Australian recording artist Kylie Minogue, which was released on 7 November 2000 by Deconstruction Records. The album was the last compilation album which was released by the record label at the time, because Minogue had released her then Parlophone album Light Years (2000). The album peaked at number sixty-three in Australia on the ARIA albums chart.

Background
It was announced that Minogue would release a compilation with her songs from Deconstruction Records. The album was entitled Hits+. The photograph used for the original cover art was later scrapped in favour of another shot, from a 1995 session by Michael Williams.

"If You Don't Love Me" was originally recorded by British group Prefab Sprout for their 1992 album A Life of Surprises.

Composition
The compilation is made up of songs from the albums Kylie Minogue (1994) and Impossible Princess (1997). The album includes all seven singles released during the time Minogue was under Deconstruction Records but does not include the Australian only single "Cowboy Style". The international release of Hits+ contains only 15 tracks, lacking "This Girl" and just 14 tracks in the U.S. and China, where "Where the Wild Roses Grow" was also omitted.

Reception

Critical response

Hits+ received positive reception from music critics, many praising it for its Deconstruction songs in a major compilation. Mackenzie Wilson from AllMusic gave it a very positive review, awarding the album four-and-a-half out of five stars. She had explained the album saying "Capitalizing on her surging popularity in the States, Arista found themselves promoting Kylie Minogue in early 2002 with the reissue of her Hits + album. This particular record highlights the cuts that made Minogue an indie darling in Europe in the mid-'90s, reflecting back on her 1994 self-titled effort and 1997's Impossible Princess. American fans might be put off just a bit, for this material is less frilly and far darker than Fevers smash single, 'Can't Get You Out of My Head'. But it's still stylish. Hits + is perfect for any fan, but it's also a great retrospective for those eager fans who are beginning to discover the wild musical world of Kylie Minogue."

Chart performance
The album debuted and peaked at number forty-one on the UK Albums Chart.

Track listing

Personnel
Adapted from liner notes.
Brothers in Rhythm – Producers (tracks 1, 3, 5, 8, 15); remixers (track 3)
Jimmy Harry – Producer (track 2)
Dave Eringa, James Dean Bradfield – Producers (track 4)
Dave Ball, Ingo Vauk – Producers (tracks 6, 9)
Nick Cave and the Bad Seeds, Tony Cohen, Victor Van Vugt – Producers (track 7)
The Rapino Brothers – Producers (tracks 10, 11)
Steve Anderson – Producer (tracks 12, 13)
Heller & Farley – Producers, remixers (track 14)

Charts

Certifications

References

2000 greatest hits albums
Kylie Minogue compilation albums
Contemporary R&B compilation albums
Trip hop compilation albums